A fuse plug is a collapsible dam installed on spillways in dams to increase the dam's capacity.

The principle behind the fuse plug is that the majority of water that overflows a dam's spillway can be safely dammed except in high flood conditions.  The fuse plug may be a sand-filled container, a steel structure or a concrete block.  Under normal flow conditions the water will spill over the fuse plug and down the spillway.  In high flood conditions, where the water velocity may be so high that the dam itself may be put in danger, the fuse plug simply washes away, and the flood waters safely spill over the dam.

Fuse plugs are used in many dams throughout the world, including at Warragamba Dam in New South Wales. Its fuse plugs are approximately 14m high.

References

Dams